KXNV-LD (channel 27) is a low-power television station licensed to Incline Village, Nevada, United States, serving the Reno area as an affiliate of the Spanish-language Telemundo network. It is owned by Gray Television alongside ABC affiliate KOLO-TV (channel 8). The two stations share studios on Ampere Drive in Reno; KXNV-LD's transmitter is located on Slide Mountain between SR 431 and I-580/US 395/ALT in unincorporated Washoe County.

Subchannels
The station's digital signal is multiplexed:

References

Low-power television stations in the United States
XNV-LD
Telemundo network affiliates
ABC network affiliates
Television channels and stations established in 2021
2021 establishments in Nevada